Picross S is a series of nonogram puzzle game developed and published by Jupiter for the Nintendo Switch game console. As with all past entries in the series, the game involves the player completing nonograms in the shortest time possible. Picross S is the successor to Jupiter's Picross e series on Nintendo 3DS.

Games

Picross S
The first game in the series, Picross S was released in Japan, Europe, and North America on 28 September 2017. The game received a mixed reception, with reviewers citing its presence of new puzzles as a positive but its blandness and lack of creativity in comparison to past entries as a negative. It released on the Nintendo Switch worldwide on 28 September 2017.

Picross S2
Picross S2 was released in Japan, Europe, and North America on 2 August 2018. This was the first game to add the Clip Picross feature, which allows players to complete a larger picture by filling out small puzzles. These are unlocked by completing every 5th, 10th, and 15th level of a page. The game was received better than Picross S1, but was still criticized for its lack of innovation.

Picross S3
Picross S3 was released in Japan, Europe, and North America on 25 April 2019. It is the highest rated game in the series based on Metacritic review scores. The game was heavily praised for the new Color Picross mode despite only having 30 of the puzzle type. In Color Picross, the picture is determined by the numbers in the top and left of the puzzle, as well as each of the colors being listed in order, leading to more complex and innovative puzzles.

Picross S4
Picross S4 was released in Japan, Europe, and North America on 23 April 2020. Picross S4 was generally liked and positively reviewed by critics due to the simple and classic nonogram gameplay, but was criticized for adding no new gameplay modes.

The only new feature is the Extra menu, which gives the player two large 30x30 puzzles. If you have save files for Picross S1, Picross S2, or Picross S3 on your system, you will receive a special 40x30 puzzle for each game you own. The only way to play every puzzle in the game is to own all of the previous games in the series.

Picross S5
Picross S5 was released in Japan, Europe, and North America on 26 November 2020. This game retains all the same modes and features of Picross S4, and adds two small "quality of life" features. A High Contrast mode was added for Color Picross, which changes the colors to make them easier to differentiate for colorblind players. The total completion time is displayed when all puzzles in a mode are completed, and for the full game once all modes are completed. These features were added to the four previous games in the series via patches released on the same day.

Picross S6
Picross S6 was released in Japan, Europe, and North America on 22 April 2021. This game retains all the same modes and features of Picross S4 and S5. The puzzle grids in Extra Mode now feature alternating colour lines every 5 squares, to make the larger puzzle size easier to parse; this feature was added to Picross S4 and S5 via patches released around the same time.

Picross S7
Picross S7 was released in Japan and Hong Kong on 23 December 2021, in Europe and Australia on 27 December 2021, and in North America on 10 January 2022. This game retains all the same modes and features of Picross S4 and S5, and adds touch screen support for handheld mode.

Picross S8
Picross S8 was released in Japan, Europe, and North America on 29 September 2022.

Spin-offs 

As with their Picross e series, Jupiter has used the mechanics and UI of Picross S as the basis for a number of licensed spin-off picross games.

Kemono Friends Picross
Kemono Friends Picross was released in Japan, Europe, and North America on 4 October 2018. Based on the Kemono Friends media franchise.

Picross Lord of the Nazarick
Picross Lord of the Nazarick was released in Europe and North America on 25 July 2019. Based on the Overlord anime.

Picross S Genesis & Master System Edition
A Sega-themed entry featuring puzzles based on 59 classic Sega Genesis and Master System games including Sonic the Hedgehog, Alex Kidd and Phantasy Star. It was released on 5 August 2021 in Japan, Europe and North America. Also known as Picross S Mega Drive & Mark III Edition in Japan and Picross S Mega Drive & Master System Edition in Europe, in line with the branding of Sega's 8- and 16-bit consoles in those regions.

Gameplay 

In the same fashion as past entries in the series, the games involve the player completing nonograms.

Reception

See also
Mario's Picross, a Picross game made by Nintendo and Jupiter.
Picross e, the predecessor to the Picross S series, for the 3DS.
Nonogram

References 

2017 video games
Jupiter (company) games
Nintendo Switch games
Picross (video game series)
Nintendo Switch-only games
Nonograms
Puzzle video games
Single-player video games
Video games developed in Japan